N1 hf. is an Icelandic company headquartered in Kópavogur that runs many petrol stations around the country.

History 
N1 was founded on April 13, 2007, by a merger between the Icelandic companies Esso and Bílanaust. The merger brought with it a change of focus for the companies, away from selling gas and towards retail. At the time of its founding, it became the 10th largest company in Iceland.

References

Companies listed on Nasdaq Iceland
Icelandic brands